Jón Sigurðsson (23 August 1946 – 10 September 2021) was an Icelandic politician. He was brought in as Minister of Industry and Commerce for the Progressive Party when Halldór Ásgrímsson abandoned politics. He was later elected party chairman from 2006 to 2007 but resigned after he failed to win a seat in the Althing (Iceland's parliament). Prior to that, he had been governor of the Central Bank of Iceland from 2003 to 2006.

Early life and career
Jón was born in Kollafjörður, Iceland, to Sigurður Ellert Ólason, a lawyer, and Unnur Kolbeinsdóttir, a teacher. Jón studied at Menntaskólinn í Reykjavík, where he graduated in 1966. From there, he studied Icelandic and history at the University of Iceland. He graduated with a BA degree in those subjects three years later.

Jón took on the job of editor of Tíminn in 1978 and served there until 1981. After that he became principal of Samvinnuskólinn at Bifröst and later he became rector of the school until 1991.

Death
In 2017, Jón was diagnosed with advanced prostate cancer. He died from the illness in September 2021.

References

External links
Official biography of Jón Sigurðsson on the parliament website

1946 births
2021 deaths
Governors of the Central Bank of Iceland
Jon Sigurdsson
Jon Sigurdsson
Jon Sigurdsson
Columbia Pacific University alumni
Deaths from prostate cancer
Deaths from cancer in Iceland